Podocarpus insularis is a species of conifer in the family Podocarpaceae. It is found in Indonesia, Papua New Guinea, Solomon Islands, and Vanuatu.

References

insularis
Least concern plants
Taxonomy articles created by Polbot
Taxa named by David John de Laubenfels
Flora of Papua New Guinea